"Christopher" is the 42nd episode of the HBO original series The Sopranos and the third episode of the show's fourth season. Its teleplay was written by Michael Imperioli, from a story idea by Imperioli and Maria Laurino. It was directed by Tim Van Patten and originally aired on September 29, 2002.

Starring
 James Gandolfini as Tony Soprano
 Lorraine Bracco as Jennifer Melfi 
 Edie Falco as Carmela Soprano
 Michael Imperioli as Christopher Moltisanti
 Dominic Chianese as Corrado Soprano, Jr. 
 Steven Van Zandt as Silvio Dante
 Tony Sirico as Paulie Gualtieri
 Robert Iler as Anthony Soprano, Jr. 
 Jamie-Lynn Sigler as Meadow Soprano *
 Drea de Matteo as Adriana La Cerva
 Aida Turturro as Janice Soprano
 Federico Castelluccio as Furio Giunta
 John Ventimiglia as Artie Bucco
 Steven R. Schirripa as Bobby Baccalieri
 Vincent Curatola as Johnny Sack
 Kathrine Narducci as Charmaine Bucco
 Joe Pantoliano as Ralph Cifaretto

* = credit only

Guest starring
Jerry Adler as Hesh Rabkin

Also guest starring

Synopsis
Silvio wants to take action against Native Americans protesting the Columbus Day parade, believing their actions to be insulting to Italian-Americans. When, without Tony's approval, he, Patsy, and Artie attempt to break up the protest, Little Paulie and several others are injured. Ralphie threatens the protest leader, Professor Del Redclay, that he will make it known that Iron Eyes Cody, a popular Native American figure, is actually an Italian-American. Tony unsuccessfully appeals to Assemblyman Ron Zellman and to an Indian chief to convince Redclay to cancel the protest. The chief invites Tony and his crew to his casino. Both the parade and protest occur without mob intervention, which upsets Silvio. Tony forcefully argues to Silvio that his achievements came through his own abilities, not through his heritage, and scorns the idea that everyone belongs to a victimized group.

At a luncheon meant to instill Italian pride in women, the "mob wives" feel singled out when the speaker attempts to dissociate Italian culture from the Mafia. After the luncheon, Gabriella lectures Father Phil about how much the mob wives, especially Carmela, have given to the parish, and says he had no right to bring in a guest speaker who intended to shame them.

The Soprano and Lupertazzi families meet over a meal: Johnny, speaking for Carmine, demands a share of the profit Tony made from Junior's warehouse, which was recently flipped. Tony agrees, but comes to the conclusion that someone from his organization is leaking information to the Lupertazzi family. Now that Johnny knows of Ralphie's joke about his wife, he is furiously hostile to him, but will not say why. 
 
Bobby's wife Karen is killed in a road accident. The mob wives feel sympathy for Bobby during the wake and discuss his having never taken a comare. Spending time with him in his home, Janice is touched by his sincere grief.

Janice is now living with Ralphie, who has left Rosalie, but after a discussion with her therapist, Janice wills herself to break up with him. When Ralphie returns home, she yells for him to leave and shoves him down the stairs, injuring his back. Janice locks herself in her room as Ralphie hobbles back to his car, bags in hand.

First appearances
 Dan Castleman: the prosecutor in Junior's trial
 Pie-O-My: The racehorse that Ralph Cifaretto buys and Tony admires
 Marty Schwartz: an associate of Hesh Rabkin's who organizes the meeting between Tony Soprano and Chief Doug Smith

Deceased
 Karen Baccalieri: wife of Bobby "Bacala" Baccalieri; dies in a car accident.

Title reference
 The title refers to the Italian explorer Christopher Columbus, the first European in several centuries to land in the Americas, in 1492. The controversy surrounding Christopher Columbus and the Columbus Day parade protests are referenced repeatedly in the episode.

Production
 Dan Castleman, who plays a prosecutor with the same name on the series, first appearing in this episode, also acts as a consultant for the show's writers, giving them expert advice on their questions about legal matters dealing with the Mafia. In his real-life career, Castleman spent 30 years in the Manhattan District Attorney's office as chief of the Rackets Bureau and then of Investigations. Castleman would be credited for his contributions and given the title of a technical adviser starting with the second part of Season Six.

References to past episodes 
During a therapy session, Janice's therapist tells her she should stop dating her brother (Tony Soprano)'s employees, citing that the last time Janice did, her fiancé ran out on her to enter the witness protection program. This is in reference to Janice's former fiancé Richie Aprile, whom Janice killed in the episode "The Knight in White Satin Armor".

Cultural references
 The speaker at the Italian women's pride event mentions such famous Italian brands as Armani, Asiago, Barolo, and Moschino, and says Italian-Americans should not be exemplified by John Gotti, but instead by Rudolph Giuliani
 Carmela tells Tony that A.J.'s teacher told his students Columbus would have been prosecuted for crimes against humanity if he lived today, just as Slobodan Milošević was then
 At breakfast, A.J. is reading A People's History of the United States (1980)
 Tony says the casino owner asked him to have Frankie Valli come perform at his casino; Valli would later act on the series, beginning with season 5, as Rusty Millio, a Lupertazzi family capo
 Silvio mentions to Tony that mobster Joe Colombo created the first Italian-American Civil Rights League in the 1970s
 Watching a news broadcast of the violence that occurred at the Columbus Day Parade, Melfi's ex-husband Richard remarks that Albinoni's Adagio should be played over the clip.
 In his conversation with Silvio, Tony reveals Silvio's daughter studies at Lackawanna College
 Chief Smith tells Tony that finding out Iron Eyes Cody is not Native American is like finding out James Caan is not Italian
 Tony refers to the movie High Noon (1952), in which Gary Cooper, playing a sheriff, faces the Miller gang
 Tony tells Silvio they should take pride in their personal accomplishments rather than merely in the Italian-American accomplishments, such as The Godfather or Chef Boyardee

Controversy
The episode created a controversy when cast members of The Sopranos (specifically Dominic Chianese and Lorraine Bracco) were banned from marching in the Columbus Day Parade in New York City, despite having received an invitation to participate in the event from New York City mayor Michael Bloomberg.

Accolades
Joe Pantoliano  won the Primetime Emmy Award for Outstanding Supporting Actor in a Drama Series at the 55th Primetime Emmy Awards in 2003 for his work in this episode and Whoever Did This.

Music
 The song played over the end credits is "Dawn (Go Away)" by Frankie Valli and the Four Seasons.
 "Elevation" by U2 and "Waiting for Tonight" by Jennifer Lopez are both playing when Carmela and Rosalie are in the gym.
 Ralph’s Ringtone is the Rocky theme.
 Bobby Baccalieri's ringtone is "La donna è mobile" by Giuseppe Verdi.

References

External links
 "Christopher"  at HBO
 

The Sopranos (season 4) episodes
2002 American television episodes
Cultural depictions of Slobodan Milošević
Television episodes directed by Tim Van Patten